Bolton was a borough constituency centred on the town of Bolton in the county of Lancashire. It returned two Members of Parliament (MPs) to the House of Commons for the Parliament of the United Kingdom, elected by the bloc vote system.

Created by the Reform Act of 1832, it was represented by two Members of Parliament. The constituency was abolished in 1950, being split into single-member divisions of Bolton East and Bolton West.

Members of Parliament

Boundaries
1832–1885: The township of Great Bolton, Little Bolton, and Haulgh, except the detached part of the township of Little Bolton which was situate to the north of the town of Bolton.

1885–1918: The existing parliamentary borough, and so much of the municipal borough of Bolton as was not already included in the parliamentary borough.

Elections

Winning candidates are highlighted in bold.

Elections in the 1830s

Elections in the 1840s

 

 

 

 
 

 

Bolling's death caused a by-election.

Bowring resigned after being appointed Consul-General at Canton, China, causing a by-election.

Elections in the 1850s

Elections in the 1860s
Crook's resignation caused a by-election.

Elections in the 1870s

Elections in the 1880s

Elections in the 1890s

Elections in the 1900s

Elections in the 1910s

Harwood's death causes a by-election.

Gill's death caused a by-election.

Taylor's resignation causes a by-election.

General Election 1914–15:

Another General Election was required to take place before the end of 1915. The political parties had been making preparations for an election to take place and by the July 1914, the following candidates had been selected; 
Liberal: Thomas Taylor
Labour: Robert Tootill
Unionist: Thomas Clarke Pilling Gibbons

Elections in the 1920s

Elections in the 1930s

Elections in the 1940s
General Election 1939–40:

Another General Election was required to take place before the end of 1940. The political parties had been making preparations for an election to take place from 1939 and by the end of this year, the following candidates had been selected; 
Conservative: Cyril Entwistle, John Haslam
Labour: E Mellor

However, in the by-election held in 1940 no other parties contested the seat due to the War-time electoral pact meaning that the Conservative candidate Edward Cadogan was elected unopposed.

References

Parliamentary constituencies in North West England (historic)
Constituencies of the Parliament of the United Kingdom established in 1832
Constituencies of the Parliament of the United Kingdom disestablished in 1950
Politics of the Metropolitan Borough of Bolton